Cybaeopsis euopla is a species of hacklemesh weaver in the spider family Amaurobiidae. It is found in the United States and Canada.

References

Amaurobiidae
Articles created by Qbugbot
Spiders described in 1935
Spiders of the United States
Spiders of Canada